Monni is a South Korean rock band signed to Modern Boy Entertainment. The quintet consists of Kim Sin-eui (vocals), Gong Tae-woo (guitar), Lee In-kyoung (bass), and Jung Hoon-tae (drums). The band formed in 2004 and they released their debut studio album First Day, Light the following year with their original drummer Song Ju-hwan. Following his departure from the band, Jung was recruited to take his place. The band released its second studio album This Moment in 2010. In celebration of their 10-year anniversary, they released a compilation entitled Monni 10th Anniversary Best Album Fix.

History
Beginning in winter 2003, Kim Sin-eui, Lee In-kyoung, Song Ju-hwan, and a keyboardist began practicing collectively. Kim read the word "monni" in a newspaper and "immediately felt that it fit the image of our band, because the simply truth is, we are all greedy for good music". He suggested the name to his bandmates, which they all found satisfactory. Monni was formally established in January 2004. They performed together at Club Sluger for three to four months until the keyboardist quit the band. With Monni's future in limbo, Kim asked former punk-rock band member Gong Tae-woo to join, which he accepted. Monni released their debut studio album First Day, Light in 2005. The lead single "Showers" is a song about death and separation, which is based on Kim experiencing the death of a friend from a disease. The following year, the band was selected as a "hidden master" and were able to perform at the annual Ssamzi Sound Festival.

After performing at a club in Hongdae, a representative of Soundholic approached Monni and they signed with the record label. In 2008, they released their first single album Monni: And,. In midst of preparing for their second studio album, Gong enlisted in mandatory military service and the band saw the departure of drummer Song. The latter was replaced by Jung Hoon-tae. In Gong's absence, the three remaining members began implementing elements of electronic music into the songs they crafted. Monni released their second album This Moment in June 2010. After spending seven years with Soundholic, Monni parted from the company in January 2014. They decided to leave the record label to "create our own music and reinvest our personal passion into songs that we could truly call ours". Kim established Modern Boy Records for the band to continue its activities.

Monni preceded the release of their fourth studio album with the single "Dotnaeyo" on March 11, 2014. They released Follow My Voice and lead single "In the Moment" the following week. They celebrated their 10-year anniversary with a compilation album; three of the twenty-two songs on its track list were decided by the band's fans. Parts one and two were released via online music stores on October 8 and 22, respectively, and the CDs were issued on October 27.

In 2017, Kim made his acting debut in Blue Busking, winning Best New Actor at the "Golden Cinema Film Festival Award".

Musical style
Musically, Monni is an alternative rock band. Early in its career, Monni's music was noted for its "vibrant, youthful appeal". Their music became "slower" and "more laid-back" over time. Kim cited indie bands Repair Shop and Cloud Cuckoo Land as his motivation. He contributes a substantial amount of the band's songwriting and integrates the products his bandmates generate. Kim's vocals have been compared to Tom Chaplin of Keane.

Members
List of members and instruments.
 Kim Sin-eui (김신의) – vocals
 Gong Tae-woo (공태우) – guitar
 Lee In-kyoung (이인경) – bass
 Jung Hoon-tae (정훈태) – drums

Former member
 Song Ju-hwan (송주환) – drums

Discography

Albums

Studio albums

Compilation albums

Live albums

Extended plays

Singles

Guest appearances

Soundtrack appearances

Notes

References

External links
 

2004 establishments in South Korea
South Korean alternative rock groups
Musical groups established in 2004
Musical quartets